Sha Tau Kok Chuen is a public housing estate developed by the Hong Kong Housing Society within the Closed Area in Sha Tau Kok, New Territories, Hong Kong. It was built to resettle the aboriginal residents of Yim Liu Ha and Tsoi Yuen Kok affected by redevelopment in Sha Tau Kok Closed Area, consisting of 52 residential blocks completed in 1988, 1989, 1991 and 2017 respectively. It is the only public housing estate with the most number of blocks in Hong Kong and is the only public housing estate to be located within the restricted area.

Houses

Politics
Sha Tau Kok Chuen is located in Sha Ta constituency of the North District Council. It is currently represented by Vincent Ko Wai-kei, who was elected in the 2019 elections.

See also

Sha Tau Kok

References

Residential buildings completed in 1988
Residential buildings completed in 1989
Residential buildings completed in 1991
Public housing estates in Hong Kong
Closed Area
Sha Tau Kok
1988 establishments in Hong Kong
Housing estates with centralized LPG system in Hong Kong